Snail Press Publications is an independent publishing company based in Los Angeles that specializes in limited edition fine art books, poetry and literature.

Founded in 2010 by Zelda Nader, Snail Press's mission is to create a new experience in book publishing.

Focused on honoring the artist, Snail Press works with the author or artist from beginning to end. Ensuring that the end product is in itself a work of art.

In 2010, the first publication was a large hardcover art book entitled “Insouciance,” which featured selected works from fine artist America Martin. The next project, "The Enthusiast," was a double-sided paperback book of poems by author and filmmaker Noah Gershman. In 2013, Snail Press will produce another large hardcover art book from America Martin entitled, "YES," with selected works from 2009 to 2012, and a hardcover slipcase book entitled "Green Candle," a series of essays by playwright Brian Torrey Scott. In 2014, "In the Wake of Sydney Jack" will be released, a non-linear series of short stories of Southern humor and tragedy by Thom Thinn.

References

External links
Snail Press Website

Publishing companies based in California